Ting Tzu-Han (born February 21, 2006) is a Taiwanese figure skater. She is the 2022 Nordic silver medalist and a two-time Taiwanese national champion (2022–23). 

She has represented Taiwan at the World Junior Championships and Four Continents Championships.

Personal life 
Ting was born on February 21, 2006, in Taipei, Taiwan. Her parents fund all of her career expenses with the help of donations from friends and local sponsorships. Ting attends a local school and had the fourth-best grades in her class in 2019. She enjoys DIY crafts, cooking, and baking. Ting admires Japan's Yuzuru Hanyu as her future goal and especially likes his "Hope and Legacy" free skating program.

Career

Early career 
Ting initially started out learning inline skating before a coach believed that she had potential and encouraged her to try figure skating. She began skating at age 6.5 years after she did not fall like other beginners during her first lessons. Ting won the 2016 Taiwanese Championships in the intermediate division, the 2017 and 2018 Taiwanese Championships in the advanced novice division, and the 2019 Taiwanese Championships in the junior division.

On the international level, Ting is the 2016 Asian Open Trophy basic novice A bronze medalist, the 2017–18 Southeast Asian Figure Skating Open Challenge advanced novice champion, the 2018 Rooster Cup advanced novice champion, and the 2019 Oceania International Novice champion. At the 2017 edition of the Asian Open Trophy, she was the youngest competitor in the advanced novice division, at only 11 years old.

2019–2020 season 
Ting began working in Canada at the Toronto Cricket, Skating and Curling Club with Joey Russell, in addition to training with her current coach Chen Kuo-Wen in Taipei. She won the 2020 Taiwanese junior title in early August by nearly 40 points over Mandy Chiang and Marissa Yi-Shan Wu. Ting then won the 2019 Tokyo Summer Figure Skating Competition.

Ting made her junior international debut on the 2019–20 ISU Junior Grand Prix, originally being assigned to 2019 JGP Poland and 2019 JGP Italy. She placed 11th in Poland and later withdrew from Italy. In February, Ting placed fifth in Junior Ladies I at the 2020 Bavarian Open. She qualified to the free skating segment at the 2020 World Junior Championships in Tallinn, ultimately finishing 17th overall.

2020–2021 season 
Ting won her third consecutive junior national title at the 2021 Taiwanese Championships in August. Due to the COVID-19 pandemic, the 2020–21 ISU Junior Grand Prix, where she would have competed, was canceled. Ting won the 2021 Chinese Taipei Figure Skating Elites Cup in the senior division.

2021–2022 season 
Ting was assigned to compete at the 2021 CS Nebelhorn Trophy to attempt to qualify a berth for Taiwan at the 2022 Winter Olympics. She placed tenth at the event with new personal bests in both the free skate and total score, resulting in Taiwan being the third reserve for the Olympics. She finished the fall season with a fourth place at the 2021 Asian Open and gold at the Taiwanese championships.  Assigned to the 2022 Four Continents Championships in Tallinn, she finished fifteenth. Ting concluded the season by making her World Championship debut, coming in twenty-sixth position.

2022–2023 season 
In her season debut, Ting placed eighth at the 2022 CS Lombardia Trophy, before coming fourth at the 2022 CS Nebelhorn Trophy. She went on to win a bronze medal at the 2022 Asian Open Trophy, and win a second consecutive Taiwanese national title. She finished thirteenth at the 2023 Four Continents Championships.

Programs

Competitive highlights 
CS: Challenger Series; JGP: Junior Grand Prix

Detailed results

Senior results

Junior results

References

External links 
 

2006 births
Living people
Taiwanese female single skaters
Sportspeople from Taipei